Parada is a civil parish in the municipality of Paredes de Coura, Portugal. The population in 2011 was 298, in an area of 5.90 km².

Geography
The parish is bounded with Padornelo to the north, Vascões and Bico e Cristelo to the south. The source of the Rio Coura is near the parish.

History

On November 15, 1993, the Associação Cultural Desportiva e Social de Parada was founded, its first president was Manuel Pereira Araújo.  The association brings in the good ways in the strength of the youch in the sporting and cultural fields, it finds the enthusiasm that represents the name of the parish.  The vitality of its youths that won 42 cups and 3 medals.  One football (soccer) matches includes two first places with 13-15 in 1996 and in 1908, three second places, the other two were in 13-15 in 1995 and in 1997, it won three consecutive district titles along with inter-parish tournaments with 5-3 against Cunha in 1995 in penalty kicks, 1-0 against Resende in 1007 and 1-0 against Associação de Paredes de Coura in 1998.  The soccer field was completed in 1998.

Economy
Its main economic activity is agriculture, civil construction and ultimately employment in the Castanheira industrial area, São Bento and in Cerveira.  Its main productions are corn, potatoes, wine and others.

Associations
ACDSP – Associação Cultural Desportiva e Social de Parada (Parada Sporting And Social Cultural Association)

References

Freguesias of Paredes de Coura